Pathways Academy is a charter school in Detroit, Michigan for students who are pregnant or new mothers.
 It is operated by Innovative Educational Programs, a company based in Basking Ridge, New Jersey.

Pathways Academy opened after Catherine Ferguson Academy, another Detroit school serving students who are pregnant or new mothers, closed.

In 2018, Pathways Academy was identified by the Michigan Department of Education as a low-performing school.

References

External links

Pathways Academy at Detroit Public Schools

Charter schools in Michigan
Charter middle schools in the United States
Charter high schools in Michigan
Educational institutions established in 2014
2014 establishments in Michigan
High schools in Detroit
Schools in Detroit
Public high schools in Michigan
Public middle schools in Michigan